Rõõmulaul is a novel by Estonian author Karl Ristikivi. It was first published in 1966 in Lund, Sweden, by Eesti Kirjanike Kooperatiiv (Estonian Writers' Cooperative). In Estonia it was published only in 1993.

1966 novels
Novels by Karl Ristikivi